Pardes may refer to:

Judaism 

 Pardes (legend), Jewish account of a Heavenly orchard
 Pardes (Jewish exegesis), a Kabbalistic theory of biblical exegesis.
 Pardès, the European Journal of Jewish Studies, co-founded by Shmuel Trigano and Annie Kriegel
 Pardes Institute of Jewish Studies, Jerusalem and New York City
 Pardes Hanna-Karkur, a town in northern Israel

Other 
 Pardes (1950 film), a 1950 Bollywood Hindi Indian Film
 Pardes (1970 film), a 1970 Bollywood Hindi Indian Film
 Pardes (1997 film), a Bollywood Hindi Indian Film
 Pardes (2015 TV series), Pakistani drama television series aired on Hum Sitaray
 Pardes (2021 TV series), Pakistani drama television series aired on ARY Digital
 Pardes Publishing is independent Israeli publishing house founded in 2000

See also
Pardesi (disambiguation)
Paradesi (disambiguation)